Giancarlo da Silva Moro (born 18 October 1982) is a Brazilian professional footballer who plays for Paraná Clube, as a striker.

Career
Born in Turvo, Giancarlo has played for America, Londrina, Iraty, Novo Hamburgo, Juventude, Portuguesa, Joinville, Glória, Chapecoense, Atlético Ibirama, Union Alexandria, Paraná and Bragantino.

References

1982 births
Living people
Brazilian footballers
Brazilian expatriate footballers
Campeonato Brasileiro Série A players
América Futebol Clube (RN) players
Londrina Esporte Clube players
Iraty Sport Club players
Esporte Clube Juventude players
Associação Portuguesa de Desportos players
Joinville Esporte Clube players
Associação Chapecoense de Futebol players
Paraná Clube players
Clube Atlético Bragantino players
Associação Atlética Ponte Preta players
Criciúma Esporte Clube players
Associação Desportiva São Caetano players
Al Ittihad Alexandria Club players
Expatriate footballers in Egypt
Association football forwards